Plácido Bernal (1914 - death date unknown) was a Cuban baseball pitcher in the Negro leagues. Also listed as Blacedo Bernal, he played with New York Cubans in 1941.

References

External links
 Seamheads 

1914 births
Year of death missing
New York Cubans players
Baseball pitchers
Cuban expatriate baseball players in the United States
People from Sancti Spíritus Province